Nanotech is a 1998 anthology of science fiction short stories revolving around nanotechnology and its effects. It is edited by American writers Jack Dann and Gardner Dozois.

Contents
"Blood Music" by Greg Bear
"Margin of Error" by Nancy Kress
"Axiomatic" by Greg Egan
"Remember'd Kisses" by Michael F. Flynn
"Recording Angel" by Ian McDonald
"Sunflowers" by Kathleen Ann Goonan
"The Logic Pool" Stephen Baxter
"Any Major Dude" Paul Di Filippo
"We Were Out of Our Minds with Joy" by David Marusek
"Willy in the Nano-lab" by Geoffrey A. Landis

External links 

1998 anthologies
Jack Dann and Gardner Dozois Ace anthologies
Ace Books books
Nanotechnology in fiction